Haileybury and Imperial Service College is an independent school near Hertford in England. Originally a boys' public school, it is now co-educational, enrolling pupils at 11+, 13+ and 16+ stages of education. Over 750 pupils attend Haileybury, of whom more than 500 board.

The following are notable alumni of Haileybury:

Arts 

 Michael Aitkens, scriptwriter
 Alan Ayckbourn, dramatist
 John Bailey, literary critic
 Davy Burnaby, actor 
 John Blofeld, Taoist and Buddhist author
 Reginald Blomfield, architect
 Bruce Bairnsfather (attended United Services College), humourist
 Erskine Childers, author of The Riddle of the Sands
 Harold Creighton, magazine proprietor
 Michael Davie, journalist and newspaper editor
 Edmund Fisher, architect
 Philip Franks, actor and director
 Charles Wellington Furse, artist
 Gerald Harper, actor
 John Howard Davies, TV director and producer
 Dom Joly, comedian and journalist
 Rudyard Kipling, winner of the Nobel Prize for Literature
 Quentin Letts, journalist
 Chris Lowe, BBC journalist and news presenter
 Simon MacCorkindale, actor
 Stephen Mangan, actor
 Lionel Marson, actor
 John McCarthy, journalist
 David Meyer, actor
 Christopher Nolan, film director
 Hoyt Richards, model and actor
 Alan Ross, poet and writer
 Joe Saward, sports journalist and author
 Rik Simpson, record producer, sound engineer, musician, and songwriter
 Alison Stephens, virtuoso classical mandolinist and recording artist
 Arthur Thomas, composer
 Herbert Trench, poet
 Rex Whistler, artist
 Peter Woodward, actor
 Tim Woodward, actor
 Bryan Wynter, artist

Armed Forces 

 Field Marshal Edmund Allenby, 1st Viscount Allenby
 Field Marshal Sir John Chapple
 Marshal of the Royal Air Force Sir William Dickson
 Marshal of the Royal Air Force Sir John Slessor
 Admiral Sir Jonathon Band, First Sea Lord
 Admiral Sir Royston Wright, Second Sea Lord
 Air Chief Marshal Sir Robert Brooke-Popham
 Air Chief Marshal Sir Trafford Leigh-Mallory
 Air Chief Marshal Sir Arthur Penrose Martyn Sanders
 General Sir Thomas Astley Cubitt
 General David Ramsbotham, Baron Ramsbotham 
 General Lionel Dunsterville
 General Sir Alexander Godley
 General Sir Hugh Henry Gough
 General Sir Reginald May
 General Sir Rupert Smith
 Lieutenant General Sir Richard Vickers 
 Major General The Reverend Morgan Llewellyn
 Major General David Shaw
 Major General Hurdis Ravenshaw
 Major General Hubert Hamilton
 Major General Sir Thompson Capper
 Major General William George Walker
 Major General Clifford Coffin
 Brigadier George William St. George Grogan
 Brigadier Francis Aylmer Maxwell
 Brigadier The Honourable Alexander Gore Arkwright Hore-Ruthven
 Brigadier-General Clifton Inglis Stockwell 
 Brigadier General Sydney Frederick Williams
 Lieutenant-Colonel Arthur Rawlins
 Lieutenant-Colonel Gordon Thorne
 Group Captain Peter Townsend
 Harry Carr, Special Intelligence Service 1919–45, Northern Area Controller (Baltic & USSR)
 Brigadier-general Archibald James Fergusson Eden CMG, DSO

Victoria Cross and George Cross holders 

Seventeen former pupils, and one master, of Haileybury and its antecedents have received the Victoria Cross, and three former pupils the George Cross.

Victoria Cross 

 Pupils

 Indian Rebellion of 1857
 General Sir Hugh Henry Gough, VC, GCB (attended East India College Haileybury)
 Ross Lowis Mangles, VC (attended East India College Haileybury) - A Civilian recipient.
 William Fraser McDonell, VC (attended East India College Haileybury) - A Civilian recipient.
 Persian War 1857
 Lieutenant Arthur Thomas Moore VC (attended East India College Haileybury) He later achieved the rank of major general and was made a Companion of the Most Honourable Order of the Bath (CB).
 Zulu War 1879
 Lieutenant Nevill Josiah Aylmer Coghill VC (attended Haileybury College, Trevelyan House from 1865 to 1869)
 Sudan Campaign 1898
 Brigadier General The Honourable Alexander Gore Arkwright Hore-Ruthven, VC, GCMG, CB, DSO & Bar, PC, Croix de Guerre (France and Belgium) . Earl of Gowrie & Viscount Ruthven of Canberra. (attended United Services College 1882.2). He was a Captain when he earned his VC.
 Second Boer War 1899–1902
 Colonel Edward Douglas Browne-Synge-Hutchinson, VC, CB (attended United Services College Day Boy 1875). He was a Major when he earned his VC.
 Brigadier General Francis Aylmer Maxwell, VC, CSI, DSO & Bar, (attended United Services College 1883–1890)
 Captain Conwyn Mansel-Jones, VC, CMG, DSO, (attended Haileybury College, Batten House 1885–1888)
 Third Somaliland Expedition 1903
 Major General William George Walker, VC, CB (attended Haileybury College, Colvin House, 1876–1881)
 First World War
 Captain Anketell Moutray Read, VC, (attended United Services College 1898–1902)
 Second Lieutenant Rupert Price Hallowes, VC, MC (attended Haileybury College, Le Bas House 1894–1897)
 Major General Clifford Coffin, VC, CB, DSO & Bar (attended Haileybury College, Lawrence House, 1884–1886)
 Captain Clement Robertson, VC (attended Haileybury College, Colvin House 1904–1906)
 Captain Cyril Hubert Frisby, VC (attended Haileybury College, Hailey House, 1899–1903)
 Brigadier General George William St. George Grogan, VC, CB, CMG, DSO & Bar (attended United Services College, 1890–1893)
 Korean War 1951
 Colonel James Carne, VC, DSO (attended Imperial Service College, (Alexander House), 1920–1923)

 Staff

 First World War
 Major Richard Raymond Willis, VC (staff at Haileybury College, 1921–1921)

George Cross 

 First World War 1919
 Wing Commander Harry "Wings" Day (Harry Melville Arbuthnot Day), GC (formerly AM)
 Second World War
 Wing Commander Laurence Frank Sinclair GC

Business 
 James Henderson; former CEO of Bell Pottinger
 Sir Clive Martin 
 Prannoy Roy; Founder NDTV
 Alan Sainsbury, Baron Sainsbury of Drury Lane

Law 
 The Rt. Hon. Lord Justice Scott Baker
 Kenelm George Digby
 Geoffrey Lawrence, 1st Baron Oaksey
 Sir Richard May
 His Honour Judge Sir James Miskin 
 Cyril Radcliffe, 1st Baron Radcliffe
 Sir Barry Sheen
 Sir Arthur Watts

Learning 
 Forster Fitzgerald Arbuthnot
 Frank Bell
 John Burnaby, Regius Professor of Divinity, Cambridge University
 Lionel Curtis, professor at Oxford University
 Bonamy Dobrée
 W. H. C. Frend
 Bertrand Hallward
 Brian Houghton Hodgson
 Alexander Francis Kirkpatrick, Master of Selwyn College, Cambridge
 Peter Ladefoged, prominent linguist and phonetician
 Robert Liddell
 Jack Meyer, founder of Millfield School and county cricketer
 Humphry Osmond
 Frank Podmore
 George Speaight

Politics 

Cuthbert James McCall Alport, Baron Alport, Cabinet Minister
 Clement Attlee, Prime Minister
 Hugh Bayley
 Sir Geoffrey de Freitas
 Barry Gardiner, Labour politician 
 Nick Herbert, Baron Herbert of South Downs
 John Robert Jermain Macnamara
 Christopher Mayhew, Baron Mayhew
 Ian Stewart, Baron Stewartby
Tom Sutcliffe MP
 David Garro Trefgarne, 2nd Baron Trefgarne
 Sir Edward Wakefield

Civil, Diplomatic and Colonial Services 

 Sir Andrew Barkworth-Wright
 Henry Bartle Frere, 1st Baronet
 John Beames ICS, Bengal cadre, author of "Memoirs of a Bengal Civilian"
 Sir Andrew Green
 Edward Maltby (British civil servant), Acting governor of Madras
 Stewart Perowne
 Rennell Rodd, 1st Baron Rennell
 Sir Harold Vincent

Sport 
 John A'Deane, New Zealand cricketer
 Tom Askwith, Olympic Rower
 John Batten, England rugby union international
 Sam Billings, English cricketer
 John Birkett, England rugby union international player and captain.
 Ronald Brooks, English cricketer
 Ernest Cheston, England rugby union international
 David Cooke, England rugby union international
 Edward D'Aeth, English first-class cricketer
 Richard Ellis, Gloucestershire and Middlesex English county cricketer
 Charles Evans, first-class cricketer
 Noel Evans, first-class cricketer
 Guy Evers, England rugby union international
 Archibald Fargus, English cricketer, scholar and clergyman
 Lionel Frere, English cricketer and tennis player
 Jamie George, England & Saracens rugby union player
 Billy Geen, Welsh rugby union international
 Darren Gerard, cricketer
 Charles Gurdon, Cambridge varsity rower and England rugby union international 
 Herbert Hake OBE, English first-class cricketer
 Nigel Harrison, English first-class cricketer
 Eric Hudson, English first-class cricketer
 Ronald Lee, English first-class cricketer
 Victor Le Fanu, Ireland rugby union international 
 Maharajkumar of Vizianagram, Indian cricketer
 Lionel Marson, English first-class cricketer
 Martin Maslin, English first-class cricketer
 Osbert Mackie, England rugby union international and Anglican priest
 William Marillier, English first-class cricketer
 Ralph McCall , Scottish first-class cricketer
 Percy Mead, English first-class cricketer
 Jack Meyer, English first-class cricketer and founder of Millfield School
 Charles Michell, English first-class cricketer
 Andrew Miller, Middlesex English county cricketer
 Sir Stirling Moss, Formula 1 racing driver
 David Newsom, English first-class cricketer and Royal Navy officer
 Mike Parkes, Engineer (Hillman Imp) and Formula 1 racing driver 
 Oscar Piastri, Formula 1 Driver
 James Souter, English first-class cricketer
 Major-General James Spens, English first-class cricketer and British Army officer
 Robert Spurway, English cricketer
 Arthur Tharp, English cricketer
 Gordon Thorne, English cricketer
 Bill Tyrwhitt-Drake, English cricketer
 Thomas Usborne, English cricketer
 Sir Harold Vincent, English cricketer
 Nick Walker (cricketer), Derbyshire and Leicestershire English county cricketer
 Peter Warfield, England rugby union international
 Alec Wills, English cricketer
 Charles Wynch, English first-class cricketer
 Chris Wyles, Saracens and USA rugby union international

Miscellaneous 

 Richard Ambler, molecular biologist
 William Henry Battle, surgeon
 Edward Clive Bayley, archaeologist
 Quentin Stafford-Fraser, co-creator of the Trojan room coffee pot
 Prince Andrew Romanov

References

Haileybury
Haileybury people